Logistic model may refer to:
 Logistic function – a continuous sigmoidal curve
 Logistic map – a discrete version, which exhibits chaotic behavior
 Logistic regression